KölnLiteraturPreis is a literary prize of Cologne, Germany for works in standard German or Colognian. The award is suspended or has been discontinued

Recipients

1990 Tilman Röhrig
1991 Albert Vogt (alias B. Gravelott)
1992 Peter Fuchs (Journalist)
1993 Helma Cardauns and Helene Rahms
1996 Martin Stankowski
1997 Peter Squentz (alias Michael Bengel)
1998 Hans Knipp
1999 Gaby Amm
2000 Reinold Louis
2001 Willy Leson
2002 Frank Schätzing
2005 Carl Dietmar
2006 Konrad Beikircher

References

German literary awards